Giuseppe Bagnera (14 November 1865 – 12 May 1927) was an Italian mathematician.

Biography
At the University of Palermo, Bagnera received his laurea in civil engineering in 1890 and then his laurea in mathematics in 1895. His teachers included Giovanni Battista Guccia, Francesco Gerbaldi ed Ernesto Cesàro. In 1899 he was appointed libero docente (lecturer) in algebraic analysis at the University of Palermo. He was appointed professor extraordinarius of infinitesimal calculus in 1901, then professor ordinarius in 1905, at the University of Messina, where he remained until the 1908 earthquake. He then taught at the University of Palermo until 1922 when he moved to the Sapienza University of Rome, where he taught until his death.

Contributions
He was an Invited Speaker, along with Michele de Franchis, of the ICM in April 1908 in Rome.

After the 1908 earthquake, Bagnera's publications included little research but consisted mainly of his lecture notes, which were of superb quality and polished to a high standard of clarity and accuracy.

Recognition
In 1909, along with Michele de Franchis, Bagnera received the prix Bordin from the French Academy of Sciences for a work on hyperelliptic surfaces. Bagnera was elected a member of the Accademia Nazionale dei Lincei and was made an honorary professor of the Washington University in St. Louis. His research dealt with finite groups, algebraic varieties, and abelian functions. His students include Michele Cipolla, Pia Nalli, and Luciano Orlando.

See also
Descendant tree (group theory)

References

1865 births
1927 deaths
19th-century Italian mathematicians
20th-century Italian mathematicians
Academic staff of the University of Messina
Academic staff of the University of Palermo
Academic staff of the Sapienza University of Rome
Washington University in St. Louis mathematicians
Mathematicians from Sicily